Metareva is a genus of moths in the subfamily Arctiinae. The genus was erected by George Hampson in 1900.

Species
 Metareva aenescens Hampson, 1900
 Metareva albescens Dognin, 1902
 Metareva endoscota Hampson, 1909
 Metareva flavescens Dognin, 1902
 Metareva paulina Dognin
 Metareva susumuca Dognin

References

External links

Lithosiini
Moth genera